Primera dama may refer to:
Primera dama (Chilean TV series), Chilean telenovela aired in August 2010-March 2011 on Canal 13
The First Lady (Colombian TV series), or Primera dama, Colombian telenovela aired in November 2011-2012 on Caracol Televisión